Ypsolopha yangi is a moth of the family Ypsolophidae. It is known from the Russian Far East and northern and south-western China.

The length of the forewings is 7–9 mm.

Etymology
The species is named in honor of Dr. Ji-Kun Yang, a Chinese lepidopterist, for his contribution to the knowledge of the Lepidopteran fauna of northeast China.

References

Ypsolophidae
Moths of Asia